Filago arvensis is a species of plant belonging to the family Asteraceae.

It is native to Europe to Western Siberia and Western Himalaya, Canary Islands, Morocco.

References

Gnaphalieae